San Joaquín Municipality may refer to:
 San Joaquín Municipality, Beni, Bolivia
 San Joaquín Municipality, Querétaro, Mexico
 San Joaquín Municipality, Carabobo, Venezuela

Municipality name disambiguation pages